The Lord (German: Der Herr) is a Christological book by Romano Guardini, a Roman Catholic priest and academic. It was first published in Germany in 1937 by Werkbund-Verlag, and an English-language translation was published in 1954 by Henry Regnery Company.

Synopsis
In The Lord, Guardini wishes to present a correct understanding of Jesus by writing about his life and person, with all the limitations which the subject necessarily imposes. Although Christ lived in a specific historical milieu, and though knowledge of the forces at work in it furthers an understanding of him, Guardini states that a biography of Christ is practicable only within the narrowest confines. Neither Jesus' personality nor his works are immediately traceable to the conditions of the times, for he came "out of the fullness of time contained in the mystery of God, and it was to this mystery that he returned after he had moved among us."

In The Lord, Guardini points to certain decisive events in Jesus' life, recognising specific directions in it and watching their sense evince and fulfill itself; but he also affirms that one shall never be able to ascertain a genuine evolution of character in the life of Jesus. It is equally impossible to motivate the unwinding of Christ's destiny or the manner in which he accomplished his designated mission, for the ultimate explanations - Guardini states - are to be found only in that impenetrable territory which Jesus calls "my Father's will" — territory forever beyond the reach of history. So Guardini ponders such words as "And Jesus advanced in wisdom and age and grace before God and men", and the passage in the Epistle to the Galatians which describes him as one "in the fullness of time," ripening to maturity deeply conscious of the history about him.

Guardini's book typifies modern exegetical criticism, approaching Jesus Christ through the Gospels, placing his life in the context of history and showing how his teachings are related to the whole body of church doctrine and practice. He does not attempt to recount Jesus' life in a chronological or logical sequence. Rather, he selects certain teachings, events, traits, and miracles and meditates upon them, offering considerations and commentary.

Considered a masterpiece by Catholic scholars, The Lord has remained in print for decades and, according to Henry Regnery, was "one of the most successful books I have ever published." The novelist Flannery O'Connor thought it "very fine" and recommended it to a number of her friends.

In an introduction to a 21st-century edition of Guardini's book, Pope Benedict XVI wrote: "The Lord has not grown old, precisely because it still leads us to that which is essential, to that which is truly real, Jesus Christ Himself. That is why today this book still has a great mission."

Excerpt

See also

 Jesus Christ
 Christology
 Christian Theology
 Jesuism
 Redeemer (Christianity)
 Lost years of Jesus
 List of books about Jesus

References

External links

 "Four meditations from The Lord", on Paying Attention
 "Introduction by Cardinal Ratzinger", Eternal Word Television Network

1937 books
Jesus Christ
Catholic theology and doctrine
German-language books
German books
Books about Jesus